Salisbury Manor is an historic 1730 farmhouse near Leeds, Greene County, New York.

The house was built by Francis Salisbury for his oldest son Abraham. The house was expanded in 1760 and 1823, leading to a mix of architectural styles.

The building was added to the National Register of Historic Places in 1979 for its architectural significance and representation of colonial era settlement. It is privately owned.

References

Houses on the National Register of Historic Places in New York (state)
Houses completed in 1730
Houses in Greene County, New York
National Register of Historic Places in Greene County, New York